Akshardham may refer to:

 Akshardham (religion), Purushottam's eternal transcendental abode in the Swaminarayan sect of Hinduism
 Swaminarayan Akshardham (Delhi), or Akshardham Temple, a Hindu temple complex in Delhi, India
 Akshardham metro station
 Swaminarayan Akshardham (Gandhinagar), a Hindu temple complex in Gandhinagar, Gujarat, India
 Akshardham metro station (Gandhinagar)
 Akshardham Temple attack, 2002
 Swaminarayan Akshardham (North America), a Hindu temple complex in Robbinsville, New Jersey, United States

See also

Bochasanwasi Akshar Purushottam Swaminarayan Sanstha (BAPS), a Hindu denomination